Project Hope is a national televised fundraising program from Singapore, organized by Mediacorp, that is shown internationally every year. Its aim is to raise funds for the needy and those hit by catastrophe. Celebrity Asian television and film actors, famous singers and other well-known personalities from the region regularly appear on the show to perform and present, as part of the show's appeal to the public to donate.

Project Hope (Singapore) started in 2009, and continued in 2010 as well.

Project Hope's theme song is 'With Hands United', written by Mayuni Omar, Sharmila Melissa Yogalingam, and Singapore Idol contestant Mathilda D'Silva. The song, along with its writers, were nominated for the Pesta Perdana Awards in 2011 for Best Theme Song.

References

Benefit concerts
Singaporean television series